The 2012 Florida Gators softball team represented the University of Florida softball program for the 2012 NCAA softball season.

Roster
The 2012 Florida Gators softball team has 1 senior, 4 juniors, 3 sophomores, and 8 freshmen.

References

Florida Gators softball seasons
2012 in sports in Florida
2012 Southeastern Conference softball season